North Carolina Highway 61 (NC 61) is a primary state highway in the U.S. state of North Carolina. It serves as the main north–south highway in eastern Guilford County, connecting Whitsett and Gibsonville.

Route description
NC 61 is a two-lane rural highway from NC 62, located between Julian and Alamance, to NC 150, in Osceola. Serving primary as a farm-to-market, it connects the farms in eastern Guilford County with Whitsett and Gibsonville.

History
Established in 1930 as a new primary routing, it traversed from NC 109, in Thomasville, to NC 60, in Julian.  In 1936, NC 61 was extended northeast to US 70, near Whitsett. In 1940, NC 61 was truncated at its current southern terminus, its former routing south to Thomasville replaced by NC 62.  In 1961, NC 61 was extended on new primary routing north and onto NC 100 to Gibsonville; there, it continued north to its current northern terminus at NC 150, in Osceola.

Major intersections

References

External links

NCRoads.com: N.C. 61

061
Transportation in Guilford County, North Carolina